Alexander Main may refer to:

 Sandy Main (1873–?), Scottish footballer and middle-distance runner
 Alexander H. Main (1824–1896), American businessman and politician